Giancarlo Boriani (14 December 1894 – 26 January 1982) was an Italian sports shooter. He competed at the 1920 Summer Olympics and 1936 Summer Olympics.

References

External links
 

1894 births
1982 deaths
Italian male sport shooters
Olympic shooters of Italy
Shooters at the 1920 Summer Olympics
Shooters at the 1936 Summer Olympics
Sportspeople from Bologna